Lucia Keskin (born 9 February 2001), known as Chi with a C , is an English comedian, actress, and online content creator.

Career 
Keskin's first viral video was an impersonation of Gemma Collins uploaded to Facebook in 2018. Her first YouTube hit was a September 2018 reenactment of Friends pilot episode. Subsequently, Keskin appeared on BBC News, accidentally Skypeing the channel during another interview. She has performed several other parodies of TV shows and characters, using greenscreen.

In The Daily Telegraph, Eleanor Halls described Keskin as "the funniest person online right now."

She featured at the 2019 Summer in the City festival.

In 2020, Keskin's parody of American Horror Story was praised by Sarah Paulson, an actress of the series. Paulson agreed with comments that encouraged Netflix to commission Keskin for her own show.

On 14 December 2020, Keskin appeared in a YouTube video advertising Sky Q alongside breakfast television presenter Lorraine Kelly, whom Keskin has impersonated in the past. They discussed popular television programmes available on the service, in addition to Kelly ranking several of Keskin's parody videos including a breakfast television parody in which she parodied Lorraine.

On 17 January 2022, Keskin announced her TV debut appearing on sitcom Sneakerhead which aired later that year on Dave.

In May 2022, Keskin appeared in the Channel 4 show Big Boys as Kelly.

Personal life 
Keskin is from Margate. She attended Dane Court Grammar School, Broadstairs. She briefly worked as an assistant in a dance school, after leaving education with just one GCSE.

She also trained at The Canterbury Academy institute of Performing Arts studying musical theatre.

In January 2022, Keskin announced she was in a relationship with a woman.

Filmography

References

External links 
 

2001 births
21st-century English comedians
Actresses from Kent
British women bloggers
Comedy YouTubers
English impressionists (entertainers)
English women comedians
English YouTubers
Entertainment-related YouTube channels
Living people
Music YouTubers
People from Margate
YouTube vloggers
21st-century English women
English LGBT actors
LGBT actresses
British LGBT comedians
LGBT YouTubers